Frank J. Chiodo (born May 8, 1968) is an American politician in the state of Iowa.

Chiodo was born in Des Moines, Iowa. He attended Grandview College and is a businessman. A Democrat, he served in the Iowa House of Representatives from 1997 to 2005 (67th district). His father, Ned Chiodo was also an Iowa State Representative.

References

1968 births
Living people
Politicians from Des Moines, Iowa
Grand View University alumni
Businesspeople from Iowa
Democratic Party members of the Iowa House of Representatives